, better known by her pen name  is a Japanese manga artist. She is a graduate of Mita Senior High School, Tokyo. She currently lives in Setagaya, Tokyo with her husband and daughter.

Profile
She began her career as a dōjinshi artist creating dōjinshi for works such as Saint Seiya, Captain Tsubasa and Maōden.

She debuted in a commercial magazine with the original work Metal Heart (serialized in Kobunsha's Comic VAL from November 1986). After her debut, she continued to contribute on numerous dōjin works. However, the later disbanding of a dōjin circle, Yajō Teikoku, she had founded with Maki Chikura, led to her taking numerous breaks from her commercial works. Due to this, there were incomplete works penned by her during this period.

During her years in middle school, she had been a fan of Masami Kurumada's manga series Ring ni Kakero, Fūma no Kojirō, Saint Seiya (all serialized in Weekly Shōnen Jump) and B't X (serialized in Monthly Shōnen Ace), sending Kurumada numerous fan letters asking to meet him, after which Kurumada finally agreed, inviting her to his workplace.

When asked about her penname in an interview in the September 2006 issue of Puff, she responded that she had originally thought of making it Jun Kōga, but subsequently changed it to Yun Kōga.

Among her noted works is Loveless, which has been serialized in Monthly Comic Zero Sum since 2002 and is ongoing, as well as her work . She has also worked as an illustrator on the noted literary magazine Faust.

In 2007, she contributed the character designs to the Sunrise anime series, Mobile Suit Gundam 00.

Manga works

Unfinished/current works
Loveless (LOVELESS) 2001–
Tenshichō (天使庁) 2002–2007
Kill Me (KILL ME) 2003–2006
Satō-kun and Tanaka-san -The blood highschool (佐藤くんと田中さん -The blood highschool) 2007–
 
Kurumada Suidoken Hero of Heroes (車田水滸伝 HERO OF HEROES) 2013–

Completed works
Riddle Story of Devil (Akuma no Riddle) 2012–2016
Earthian (アーシアン) 1987–1995
Saffron Zero Beat (サフラン・ゼロ・ビート) 1988–1991 
Kodomotachi wa Yoru no Juunin (子供たちは夜の住人) 1988–1990
 
 
Rōrakaizā (ローラカイザー) 1988–1993
 
 
 
 
REN AI - Renai - (REN-AI 恋愛) 1989–1999
 
 
 
You're My Only Shinin' Star (You're My Only Shinin' Star 君はぼくの輝ける星) 1989–1990 
Kiga Ichizoku (飢餓一族) 1992–1993 
 1992–2001
Yousei Jiken (妖精事件) 1993–1999
 
 
 
 
La Vie en Rose (LA VIE EN ROSE) 1995–1998
 
 
Crown of Love (恋愛-CROWN-) 1998–2002
Hapipuri (はぴぷり) 1999–2001 
Earthian Gaiden Himitsu no Hanazono (アーシアン外伝 秘密の花園) 2002 
Bite Me

Incomplete works
B-gata Doumei (B型同盟) 1988–1989
 
Genji (源氏) 1988–1995
 
 
 
 
 
 
 
 
Yajō Teikoku (夜嬢帝国) 1988–1989
 
Arisu in Wonderland (ありす IN WONDERLAND) 1989–1992
 
 
Vanpu - Kyūketsu no To - (ヴァンプ-吸血の徒-) 1989–1995
Hurricane Hill (ハリケーン・ヒル) 1997
Chronicle (クロニクル) 1998

Short works
Metal Heart (メタルハート) 1986
Mind Size (マインドサイズ) 1986–1988
Glass Magic (グラス・マジック) 1988
Hot Staff '88 (ほっと・すたっふ'88) 1988
Ōkami wo Meguru Bouken (狼をめぐる冒険) 1989
Kugatsu no Natsu (9月の夏) 1989
Yakusoku no Natsu (約束の夏) 1991
Yousei Jiken 1992 (妖精事件 1992) 1992
Kurayamizaka (暗闇坂) 1999

Collaborations
Wakakusa Monogatari (若草物語) (original creator: Louisa May Alcott) 1985 
Choushinka Enasu (超新化エナス) (original creator: Toshiki Hirano) 1988–1989
Carol - K (CAROL-K) (original creator: Naoto Kine) 1995–1998
Clock Tower Ghost Head (クロックタワーゴーストヘッド) (original creator: Human Entertainment) 1998
Majuu no Kuru Yoru (魔獣の来る夜) (Kaoru Kurimoto) 2001 
Houkago, Nanajikan-me. (放課後、七時間目。) (original creator: Nisio Isin) 2006
Mobile Suit Gundam 00 in those days (機動戦士ガンダム00 in those days) (original creator: Sunrise) 2008–2010 
Neon Genesis Evangelion Comics Tribute (新世紀エヴァンゲリオン コミックトリビュート) (original creator: Gainax, khara inc.) 2010
Mobile Suit Gundam 00 Paradise TV (機動戦士ガンダム00 楽園TV) (original creator: Sunrise) 2010
Itsuka Dokoka no Matikado de (いつかどこかの街角で) (original creator: Sunrise) 2010

Artbook collections
LOVE SONGS (1988) 
SSSSPECIAL (1989) 
YOUR EYES ONLY (2005) 
Mobile Suit Gundam 00 Kouga Yun Design Works (2009) 
Mobile Suit Gundam 00 Kouga Yun Dear Meisters COMIC&ARTS (2009) 
Mobile Suit Gundam 00 Kouga Yun Works Complete (2010)

Other works
Cycland (CYCLAND サイクランド) 1991 
Imadoki no Vampire: Bloody Bride Setting Collection (いまどきのバンパイア-高河ゆん+大貫健一設定原画集) 1997 
LOVELESS MIND MAP (LOVELESS MIND MAP) 2005

Original character designs
Carol (Naoto Kine) - (Magic Bus)
High School Aura Buster (Mio Wakagi) - OVA (OLM, Inc.)
Imadoki no Vampire: Bloody Bride - PlayStation video game (Atlus) (dating sim)
Mobile Suit Gundam 00 - anime television series (Sunrise)
Mobile Suit Gundam 00 the Movie: Awakening of the Trailblazer - anime film (Sunrise)
Un-Go - anime television series (Bones)

Illustrations
Makenden (Seika Nagare)
Mangaka Marina series (Hitomi Fujimoto)
High School Aura Buster (Mio Wakagi)
Light Gene no Isan (Chōhei Kambayashi)
Moerurubu Tokyo Annai 2006

References

External links

 
Women manga artists
Japanese female comics artists
Anime character designers
Living people
1965 births
Manga artists from Tokyo
People from Shinagawa
Female comics writers
Japanese women writers